Maylands may refer to:
 Maylands, South Australia, a suburb of Adelaide
 Maylands, Western Australia, a suburb of Perth

See also
 Mayland (disambiguation)